Abū Isḥāq Ibrāhīm ibn Muḥammad ibn al-Sarī al-Zajjāj was a grammarian of Basrah, a scholar of philology and theology and a favourite at the Abbāsid court. He died in 922 at Baghdād, the capital city in his time.

Life 
Abū Isḥāq Ibrāhīm ibn Muḥammad al-Sarī (Surrī) al-Zajjāj had been a glass-grinder – al-Zajjāj means ‘the glassman’ - before abandoning this trade to study philology under the two leading grammarians, al-Mubarrad of the Baṣran school and Tha'lab of the Kufan school. As top student and class representative he advised al-Mubarrad. He studied “Al-Kitāb” of Sībawayh with the Baṣrah grammarian Abū Fahd.

Al-Zajjāj entered the Abbāsid court, first as tutor to al-Qāsim ibn ‘Ubayd Allāh, son of the vizier ‘Ubayd Allāh ibn Sulaymān ibn Wahb’s  and later, as tutor to the sons of the caliph al-Mu‘taḍid.

On his succession to the vizierate, Caliph al-Mu’taḍid ordered vizier al-Qāsim to commission an exposition of the Compendium of Speech by Maḥbarah al-Nadīm. Both Tha’lab and Al-Mubarrad declined the project for lack of knowledge and old age respectively. Al-Mubarrad proposed his friend and relative novice al-Zajjāj, who was commissioned to work on just two sections as a trial of his abilities. In doing his research he consulted books on language by Tha‘lab, al-Sukkarī, et al. He was assisted by  al-Tirmidhī the Younger, as his amanuensis.  The bound two-section commentary greatly impressed Caliph al-Mu’taḍid and al-Zajjāj was given the work to complete the commentary for the payment of three hundred gold dīnār. The finished manuscript was kept in al-Mu’taḍid's royal library, and the issuing of any copies to other libraries was prohibited.

Winning the caliph's favour, he received a royal pension of three hundred gold dīnār from three official roles as court companion, jurist and scholar.

Among al-Zajjāj's pupils were the grammarian Abū Alī al-Fārisī and Abū ‘l-Qāsim Abd ar-Raḥmān, author of the Jumal fi ‘n-Nawhi, Ibn al-Sarrāj and ‘Alī al-Marāghī the rival of Abu al-‘Abbās Tha’lab.{{refn|group=n|Perhaps this was al-Mubarrad Abū al-‘Abbās

Al-Zajjāj had a dispute with al-Khayyāṭ, a grammarian-theologian of Samarqand, whom he met in Baghdād.

Al-Zajjāj died at Baghdād on 13 October 922  [Friday, 18th, or 19th, Jumada al-Akhirah 310 AH] - other sources give 924 and 928 [311 and 316 AH.], aged over eighty.

Selected works

 Kitāb mā fassarahu min jāmi‘ an-nuṭq; ‘Exposition of the "Compendium of Speech". Ibn Khallikān describes this as "Extracts from his complete Treatise on Logic with his own commentary"; 

 Kitāb ma’ānī al-Qur’ān, ‘Meaning of the Qur’ān’; tafsir (exegesis) of ambiguities, metaphors and figurative expressions.

 Kitāb al-Ishtiqāq; Etymology

 Kitāb al-Qawāfī;

 Kitāb al-‘Arūḍ; Prosody

 Kitāb al-farqu; Differentiation

 Kitāb kulq al-Insān; The nature of Man

 Kitāb kulq al-faris; The nature of the Horse

 Kitāb mukhtaṣir nuḥw; Abridgment of Grammar

 Kitāb Fa‘altu wa-Af‘altu; on the first and fourth Arabic verb forms

 Kitāb mā yunṣarif wa-mā lā yunṣarif; ‘What Is Inflected and What Is Not Inflected’

 Kitāb ṣahr abyāt Sībawayh; Commentary on the verses in the grammar of Sībawayh;

 Kitāb an-nawādir; Book of Rare Forms. 

 Book of Dictates;

 Book of Anecdotes;

 Treatise on the influence of the constellation upon the weather

Abū Alī al-Fārisī wrote a treatise in refutation of al-Zajjāj, titled Kitāb al-masā’il al-maslahat yurwiha ‘an az-Zajjāj wa-tu’raf bi-al-Aghfāl; the Aghfāl (‘Negligences’, or ‘Beneficial (Corrected) Questions’), in which he refutes al-Zajjāj in his book Maāni (Rhetoric).

See also
List of Arab scientists and scholars

Further reading

Notes

References

Citations

Bibliography

840s births
922 deaths 
Year of birth uncertain
10th-century linguists
10th-century philologists
10th-century philosophers
10th-century scientists
10th-century zoologists
Hadith scholars
10th-century people from the Abbasid Caliphate
Scholars from the Abbasid Caliphate
Arabists
Botanists of the medieval Islamic world
Grammarians of Arabic
Grammarians of Basra
Iraqi anatomists
Iraqi philologists
Linguists from Iraq
Medieval grammarians of Arabic
People from Baghdad
Zoologists of the medieval Islamic world
Courtiers of the Abbasid Caliphate